Pioneer Marshal is a 1949 American Western film directed by Philip Ford and written by Robert Creighton Williams. The film stars Monte Hale, Paul Hurst, Nan Leslie, Roy Barcroft, Damian O'Flynn and Myron Healey. The film was released as a Fawcett Movie Comic#1 on November 24, 1949, by Republic Pictures.

Plot

Cast     
Monte Hale as Marshal Ed Sherwood Posing as Ted Post
Paul Hurst as Huck Homer
Nan Leslie as Susan Devlin
Roy Barcroft as Clip Pearson
Damian O'Flynn as Bruce Burnett
Myron Healey as Larry Devlin
Ray Walker as Harvey Masters
John Hamilton as Man with Bracelet
Clarence Straight as Bartender
Robert Williams as Rodney

Comic book adaptation
 Fawcett: Pioneer Marshal (1950)

References

External links 
 

1949 films
American Western (genre) films
1949 Western (genre) films
Republic Pictures films
Films directed by Philip Ford
Films adapted into comics
American black-and-white films
1940s English-language films
1940s American films